Chile's 2017 census reported a population of 17,574,003 people. Its rate of population growth has been decreasing since 1990, due to a declining birth rate. By 2050 the population is expected to reach approximately 20.2 million people, at which it is projected to either stagnate or begin declining. About 85% of the country's population lives in urban areas, with 40% living in Greater Santiago. The largest agglomerations according to the 2002 census are Greater Santiago with 5.6 million people, Greater Concepción with 861,000
and Greater Valparaíso with 824,000.

Population

The proportion of children below the age of 15 in 2015 was 20.1%, 69.0% was between 15 and 65 years of age, while 10.9% was 65 years or older.

Structure of the population 

Structure of the population (01.07.2013) (Estimates):

Ancestry and ethnic structure

Chile is a diverse society, home to individuals with varied ethnic backgrounds. Studies on the ethnic makeup of Chile differ significantly from one another.

A public health book from the University of Chile states that 30% of the population is of Caucasian origin; Mestizos with predominantly-White ancestry are estimated to amount a total of 65%, while Amerindians comprise the remaining 5%. UNAM professor of Latin American studies, Francisco Lizcano, estimates that a predominant 52.7% of the Chilean population can be classified as culturally European, with an estimated 44% as Mestizo, although this estimation is based on cultural aspects. Other social studies put the total number of Whites at over 60%. According to the CIA World Factbook, the entire population consists of a combined 95.4% of "Whites and Mixed-Race people" and 4.6% of Amerindians. These figures are based on a national census held in 2002, which classified the population as indigenous and non-indigenous rather than as White or Mestizo.

The 2011 Latinobarómetro survey asked respondents in Chile to identify their race, with the majority (59%) selecting "white," followed by "mestizo" (25%), and "indigenous" (8%). In a 2002 national poll, the majority of Chileans reported having "some" (43.4%) or "much" (8.3%) indigenous ancestry, while 40.3% claimed to have none.

Population genetics 
Genetics studies fluctuate between 51.6% and 67.9% European; between 32.1% and 44.3% Amerindian; and 2.5%—6.3% African ancestry percentages. A genetic study by the University of Chile found that the average Chilean's genetic makeup consists of 64% Caucasian and 35% Amerindian ancestry. In a 2014 study of Chilean soldiers stationed in Arica, researchers found that the average self-identifying white person (37.9%) was genetically only 54% European.

European immigration 

Chile - located far from Europe and difficult to reach - was never an attractive place for migrants from Europe, a situation recognized in the census of 1907, the census which recorded the highest percentage of Europeans versus the total population of Chile (2.2%).

European migration in the 19th century did not result in a remarkable change in the ethnic composition of Chile, except in the region of Magellan.

Spain was the largest source of European immigration to Chile, since there was never large-scale non-Spanish immigration, as happened in neighboring nations such as Argentina or Uruguay. Therefore, neither have whitened the Chilean population to level of overall percentages. Facts about the amount of the flow of immigration do not coincide with certain national chauvinistic discourse, in which Chile, like Argentina or Uruguay, would have been constituted due to immigration in one of the white Latin American countries, in contrast to what prevails in the rest of South America. However, it is undeniable that immigrants have played a role in Chilean society. Between 1851 and 1924 Chile only received 0.5% of the European immigration flow to Latin America, against 46% to Argentina, 33% to Brazil, 14% to Cuba, and 4% to Uruguay. This was because most of the migration occurred across the Atlantic, not the Pacific, and this migration occurred mostly before the construction of the Panama Canal. Also, Europeans preferred to stay in countries closer to their homelands instead of taking the long journey through the Straits of Magellan or crossing the Andes. In 1907, European-born reached a peak of 2.2% of the Chilean population; the proportion reduced to 1.9% in 1920 and 1.6% in 1930.

The largest contingent of people to have arrived in post-independence Chile came from Spain and from the Basque country, a region divided between northern Spain and southern France. Estimates of the number of Chileans who have one or two surnames of Basque origin range from 10% (1,600,000) to as high as 20% (3,200,000). Note that this phenomenon occurs not only in Chile, but also in every Autonomous Community of Spain, as well as in other Latin American countries - one can see that a substantial portion of their populations have one or two surnames of Basque or Navarre origin, tending to be more common in the upper classes, and hence becoming more unusual in lower classes.

Chile's various waves of non-Spanish immigrants include Italians, Irish, French, Greeks, Germans, English, Scots, Croats, and Poles.

In 1848 an important and substantial German immigration took place, laying the foundation for the German-Chilean community. Sponsored by the Chilean government for the colonization of the southern region, the Germans (including German-speaking Swiss, Silesians, Alsatians and Austrians), strongly influenced the cultural and racial composition of the southern provinces of Chile. It is difficult to count the number of descendants of Germans in Chile, given the great amount of time since 1848. Because many areas of southern Chile were sparsely populated, the traces of German immigration there are quite noticeable. An independent estimate calculates that about 500,000 Chileans could descend from German immigrants.

Other historically significant immigrant groups included Croats, whose descendants today are estimated at 380,000 persons, or 2.4% of the Chilean population. Some authors claim that close to 4.6% of the Chilean population must have some Croatian ancestry. Over 700,000 Chileans (4.5% of the Chilean population) may have British (English, Scottish or Welsh) and Irish forebears. Chileans of Greek descent are estimated to number between 90,000 and 120,000; most live in or near either Santiago or Antofagasta, and Chile is one of the five countries in the world most populated with descendants of Greeks. The descendants of Swiss immigrants add 90,000, and estimates suggest that about 5% of the Chilean population has some French ancestry. 600.000 Chileans descend from Italian immigrants. Other groups of Europeans exist but are found in smaller numbers, such as the descendants of Austrians and Dutchmen (estimated at about 50,000).

Latin American immigrants 

Since the reestablishment of democracy in Chile, the former tendency for emigrants from the country to outnumber immigrants to it has reversed. Chile now is one of the two countries in Latin America with a positive migration rate. Since 1990, with the opening of Chile to the world, through a free market system, and the consequent socioeconomic development of the country, has been noted the attraction of a significant number of immigrants from various Latin American countries, which represented in Census 2017, approximately 1,200,000 people, corresponding to 7% of the population residing in the Chilean territory, without counting their descendants born in Chile, due to the effects of the ius soli. Their main origins, corresponds to: 288,233 Venezuelans, 223,923 Peruvians, 179,338 Haitians, 146,582 Colombians, 107,346 Bolivians, 74,713 Argentines, 36,994 Ecuadorians, 18,185 Brazilians, 17,959 Dominicans, 15,837 Cubans and 8,975 Mexicans.

This has prompted a change in the physiognomy of certain communes in the country where its number is concentrated. In communes such as Santiago Centro and Independencia, 1/3 of residents is a Latin American immigrant (28% and 31% of the population of these communes, respectively). Other communes of Greater Santiago with high numbers of immigrants are Estación Central (17%) and Recoleta (16%). In the northern regions such as Antofagasta region, 17.3% of the population is a Latin American foreigner, with communes such as Ollagüe (31%), Mejillones (16%), Sierra Gorda (16%) and Antofagasta (11%), with high percentages of Latin American immigrants, mainly Bolivians, Colombians and Peruvians.

Indigenous communities

The 1907 census reported 101,118 Indians, or 3.1% of the total country population. Only those that practiced their native culture or spoke their native language were considered, irrespective of their "racial purity."

According to the 2002 census, only indigenous people that still practiced a native culture or spoke a native language were surveyed, and 4.6% of the population (692,192 people) fit that description. Of that 4.6%, 87.3% declared themselves Mapuche. Most of the indigenous population show varying degrees of mixed ancestry.

Chile is one of the twenty-two countries to have signed and ratified the only binding international law concerning indigenous peoples, Indigenous and Tribal Peoples Convention, 1989. It was adopted in 1989 as the International Labour Organization (ILO) Convention 169. Chile ratified the convention in 2008. In November 2009, a court decision in Chile, considered to be a landmark ruling in indigenous rights concerns, made use of the ILO convention 169. The Supreme Court decision on Aymara water rights upholds rulings by both the Pozo Almonte tribunal and the Iquique Court of Appeals, and marks the first judicial application of ILO Convention 169 in Chile.

Other ethnic groups 
It is estimated that about 5% of the population (800,000) is descendant of Asian immigrants, chiefly from the Middle East (i.e. Palestinians, Syrians and Lebanese, see Arab Chileans). Most of these are Christians from the Levant, of whom roughly 500,000 are Palestinian descendants, mostly Christians, are believed to reside in Chile. Additionally, about 18,000 - 25,000 Jews reside in Chile.

In recent years, Chile has had a growing East Asian population, mainly from China (see Chinese Chilean), but also from Japan (see Japanese Chilean) and South Korea (see Koreans in Chile). The earliest wave of East Asian immigration took place in the late 19th and early 20th centuries, mainly Chinese and Japanese contract laborers.

Chile administers Easter Island a territory 4,100 km west of the mainland. The Rapa Nui people are native to the island and are Polynesian in origin. About 3,500 live on the island, but around 10,000 came to the mainland in the 20th century.

There is a sizable population of Romani people in Chile. They are widely and easily recognized, and continue to hold on to their traditions and language, and many continue to live semi-nomadic lifestyles traveling from city to city and living in small tented communities

Languages

The Spanish spoken in Chile is distinctively accented and quite unlike that of neighbouring South American countries because final syllables and "s" sounds are dropped, and some consonants have a soft pronunciation. Accent varies only very slightly from north to south; more noticeable are the small differences in accent based on social class or whether one lives in the city or the country. That the Chilean population was largely formed in a small section at the center of the country and then migrated in modest numbers to the north and south helps explain this relative lack of differentiation, which was maintained by the national reach of radio, and now television, which also helps to diffuse and homogenize colloquial expressions.

There are several indigenous languages spoken in Chile: Mapudungun, Quechua, Aymara and Rapa Nui. After the Spanish invasion, Spanish took over as the lingua franca and the indigenous languages have become minority languages, with some now extinct or close to extinction.

German is spoken to a great extent in southern Chile, either in small countryside pockets or as a second language among the communities of larger cities.

Through initiatives such as the English Opens Doors program, the government made English mandatory for students in fifth-grade and above in public schools. Most private schools in Chile start teaching English from kindergarten. Common English words have been absorbed and appropriated into everyday Spanish speech. Since 2010, all students from 3rd grade in secondary school have been tested on listening and reading comprehension in English. The evaluation is compulsory and the instrument is TOIEC Bridge, developed by Educational Testing Service.

Religion

Christianity is the largest religion in Chile, with Roman Catholicism being the largest denomination. In the most recent census (2002), 70 percent of the population over age 14 identified as Roman Catholic and 15.1 percent as evangelical. In the census, the term "evangelical" referred to all non-Catholic Christian churches with the exception of the Eastern Orthodox Church and Oriental Orthodox Church (Arab, Greek, Persian, Serbian, Ukrainian, and Armenian), The Church of Jesus Christ of Latter-day Saints (LDS Church), Seventh-day Adventists, and Jehovah's Witnesses. Approximately 90 percent of evangelicals are Pentecostal. Wesleyan, Lutheran, Reformed Evangelical, Presbyterian, Anglican, Episcopalian, Baptist and Methodist churches are also present. Non-religious people, atheists account for around 8% of the population.

Vital statistics

Official statistics

1This estimate and those of previous years were made before the 2012 census results were known.

(p) = preliminary figures.| 20201

Current vital statistics

United Nations estimates

The Population Department of the United Nations prepared the following estimates.

2012 Census

According to the Chilean census held in 2012, the population of Chile was 16,634,603.

The methodology used for the census was questioned by advisors to the National Statistics Institute (INE), however, which led to an investigation and the resignation of its director, Francisco Labbé, in April 2013. At the same time, the Chilean government ruled out doing the census over again.

Graphs and maps

References

 
Society of Chile
Social history of Chile